Des Moines Memorial Drive, also known locally as the Living Road of Remembrance, is a road in southern King County, Washington noted for its large numbers of American Elm trees planted as a memorial to soldiers killed in World War I.

Route description
Des Moines Memorial Drive traces a path through the middle of the region of King County informally known as Highline, beginning in downtown Des Moines at Marine View Drive.  It continues approximately north through SeaTac and Burien to South 188th Street, then turns west and becomes part of SR 509.  At Ambaum Boulevard and Normandy Road it turns north again and heads approximately northeast through Boulevard Park and becomes 14th Avenue South at SR 99 and the city boundary of Seattle.

History
Originally called the High Line Road, or sometimes the Des Moines Road, the road was a major thoroughfare between Seattle and Tacoma and was thought at the time to be more important than the more well-known Pacific Highway a few miles to the east.

War Memorial
On November 11, 1921, members of the Seattle Garden Club, led by Lillian Gustin McEwan, planted 25 trees along the road, intending to establish it as a war memorial.  Eventually 1,100 Elms were planted, representing the number of soldiers from Washington State killed in the war.

Decline and Restoration
Over the years most of the trees were stricken by Dutch elm disease and eventually succumbed to radical pruning and aging.  King County is undertaking a project to restore and enhance the memorial.

References

External links
 Road of Remembrance
 King County Corridor Management Plan

Roads in Washington (state)